Major General Hisham Ikhtiyar; 1941 – 20 July 2012) (family name also transliterated as Ikhtiar, Bakhtiar, Bekhityar, Bekhtyar and other variants) was a Syrian military official, and a national security adviser to president Bashar al-Assad.

Early life
Hisham Ikhtiyar was born to a Sunni family in Damascus in 1941.

Career
Ikhtiyar was director of the general security directorate from 2001 to 2005. He was one of the effective Syrian officers, who monitored and repressed the Muslim Brotherhood in Syria.

Then he was appointed head of Syria’s general intelligence directorate. In addition, he was an advisor to Syrian president Bashar Assad. He was appointed director of the Ba'ath Party regional command's national security bureau (NSB) in 2005.

Controversy
Ikhtiyar was regarded as a part of Assad's inner circle. In 2006, the United States Treasury Department announced that American citizens and organizations were forbidden from engaging in any transactions with Ikhtiyar, for "significantly contributing to the Syrian Government's support for designated terrorist organizations,", and in 2007, Ikhtiyar was included on a list of Syrians forbidden to enter American territory. Gen Ikhtiar was reportedly charged with quelling the initial pro-democracy protests in Deraa. The brutal crackdown launched by the security services in the southern city helped trigger the recent nationwide unrest. In May 2011, the US treasury department and the European Union imposed sanctions on the National Security Bureau, saying it had directed Syrian security forces to use extreme force against demonstrators.

Rumoured death
On 19 May 2012, the Free Syrian Army's (FSA) Damascus council announced that one of their operatives from the FSA's Al Sahabeh battalion had successfully poisoned all eight members of Bashar Assad's Crisis Cell, a group of top military officials who run the Syrian army's daily operations. The Free Syrian Army's Damascus council said they believed at least six out of the eight members, including Hasan Turkmani, Assef Shawkat, Mohammad al-Shaar, Daoud Rajha, Hisham Ikhtiyar and Mohammad Said Bakhtian, to have been killed. Mohammad al-Shaar, then interior minister, and Hasan Turkmani, then assistant vice president, denied their own deaths to State TV, calling it "categorically baseless".

Death
Ikhtiyar was wounded in the 18 July 2012 Damascus bombing of the Syrian Central Crisis Management Cell. On 20 July 2012, Syrian state television announced that he had died from his injuries.

References

External links

1941 births
2012 deaths
Politicians from Damascus
Syrian Sunni Muslims
Members of the Regional Command of the Arab Socialist Ba'ath Party – Syria Region
Syrian generals
Military personnel killed in the Syrian civil war
Assassinated Syrian politicians
Deaths by explosive device
Terrorism deaths in Syria
Assassinated military personnel
2012 murders in Syria
Syrian individuals subject to U.S. Department of the Treasury sanctions